Elysius is a fictional character appearing in American comic books published by Marvel Comics.

Elysius is an artificially created being constructed by the Titanian super computer ISAAC, and possesses some of the superhuman attributes of an Eternal from Titan.  She became the lover of Mar-Vell, and after his death used his genetic material to impregnate herself with Genis-Vell and Phyla-Vell.

Fictional character biography
Elysius was created by ISAAC, the sentient computer system of Titan. She serves as ISAAC's lieutenant, and aided ISAAC in its conquest of Titan.

She later aided Captain Mar-Vell, and Drax the Destroyer against ISAAC, Stellarax, Lord Gaea, and Chaos. She then began her romance with Mar-Vell. She returned to Earth with Mar-Vell and Rick Jones.

She later accompanied Mar-Vell to Denver to visit Rick Jones. She accompanied Betty Ross, Rick Jones, and Fred Sloan to Gamma Base in search of Mar-Vell and the Hulk. She departed Gamma Base with Mar-Vell.

Some time later, Elysius attended the death-watch of Captain Mar-Vell.

Later, she remained on Titan when Starfox departed for Earth to join the Avengers.

Powers and abilities
Elysius is an artificially created being patterned on and possessing some of the attributes of the Titanians, a lesser sub-branch of the long-lived offshoot of humanity called the Eternals. She has enhanced stamina, and her strength, speed, and durability are higher than that of a human, although she does not possess the ability to fly or levitate.  She has limited telepathic abilities of an unrevealed nature. She keeps griffin-like creatures which obey her telepathic commands.

She uses an alien hand-weapon capable of disrupting force fields or of firing energy of an unspecified nature as bursts of concussive force. ISAAC crafted her personal sky-ship, which resembles an ancient Earth galleon but possesses the capacity of flight.

References

External links
http://en.marveldatabase.com/Elysius

Characters created by Doug Moench
Characters created by Pat Broderick
Comics characters introduced in 1978
Eternals (comics)
Fictional characters with superhuman durability or invulnerability
Marvel Comics characters who can move at superhuman speeds
Marvel Comics characters with superhuman strength
Marvel Comics female superheroes
Marvel Comics superheroes
Marvel Comics telepaths